Hal Wolf (January 31, 1926 – January 8, 1992) was an American politician. He served as a Republican member for the 22nd district of the Washington House of Representatives.

Life and career 
Wolf was born in Tacoma, Washington. He attended Yelm High School and the University of Puget Sound. He served in the United States Navy during World War II.

In 1965, Wolf was elected to represent the 22nd district of the Washington House of Representatives. He served until 1973, when he was succeeded by Del Bausch.

Wolf died in January 1992 of cancer, at the age of 65.

References 

1926 births
1992 deaths
Politicians from Tacoma, Washington
Republican Party members of the Washington House of Representatives
20th-century American politicians
Deaths from cancer
University of Puget Sound alumni